Delaware Wing Civil Air Patrol is the highest echelon of Civil Air Patrol (CAP) in the state of Delaware.  Delaware Wing headquarters is located at Dover Air Force Base. It comprises seven squadrons from Claymont to Georgetown, and a unit just over the border in Elkton, Maryland.
Delaware Wing is abbreviated as DEWG. As a federally chartered organization, CAP has 3 primary missions as instructed by Congress. The missions include providing aerospace education and training for all of its members, teaching leadership skills to Delaware youth, and performing various domestic emergency services for the United States of America in a noncombatant capacity.

History 
Delaware Wing has a long CAP history since CAP's inception in 1941.  Delaware is home to one of the original "Coastal Patrol" units, based in Rehoboth Beach.  Using private aircraft, the "Flying Minute Men" patrolled the Atlantic Ocean for German submarines.  They operated off of a small, unpaved airport near Airport Road in Delaware. Civil Air Patrol planes that crashed in the line of duty while patrolling the United States East Coast during World War II were hauled to the historical Dover Post building, which was an aircraft hangar at the time.

Missions 

Delaware Wing works in all three CAP missions: Cadet Programs, Aerospace Education, and Emergency Services. Most notably, Delaware Wing regularly assists DelDOT through the use of CAP planes, including Cessna 172 Skyhawks and Cessna 182 Skylanes. Delaware Wing has 5 corporate aircraft.  For example, CAP aircraft monitor traffic during the Sprint Cup Series at Dover International Speedway in Dover, DE.  In addition, CAP aircraft monitors daily traffic volume and reports to DelDOT road blockages from downed trees or a major accident, street and highway flooding, collapsed or washed-out bridges, and weekend beach traffic. By working closely with DelDOT, responders can be dispatched promptly and road crews can be summoned to block off accident sites while rerouting traffic if necessary.

Delaware Wing Cadet Advisory Council 
Delaware Wing Cadet Advisory Council (CAC) consists of 10 cadets from across Delaware Wing to promote and further cadet activities in Delaware. Each of the 6 cadet and composite squadrons in Delaware Wing elects one primary representative and one alternate representative to attend the monthly CAC meetings. In addition, the CAC representatives elect the Chair, Vice Chair, and Recorder, who heads the monthly meetings and writes the agenda and minutes. Also, the Delaware Wing CAC elects members to the Middle East Region Cadet Advisory Council.
The CAC organizes the extremely popular Cadet Ball, held annually at Dover Air Force Base.

Encampment and National Cadet Special Activities 
Delaware Wing coordinates with Maryland Wing and National Capital to hold Tri-Wing Encampment every year at Camp Frettard in Maryland. Delaware Wing is one of the few wings who does not have its own encampment due to its small population and area.

In addition, Delaware Wing cadets frequently attend National Cadet Special Activities, which gives cadets a  diverse experience of military installations across America. Activities focus on career exploration, leadership development, search and rescue skills, aeronautical training, Air Force familiarization, government, and a variety of other topics.

Squadrons in Delaware Wing 
Delaware Wing has eight typical squadrons registered to the state. Four are located in New Castle County, two in Kent County, one in Sussex County, and one in Cecil County, Maryland. There is two composite squadrons, four cadet squadrons, and one senior squadron.  There are also three non-standard squadrons (000, 001, and 999) under Delaware Wing Headquarters.

Past Wing commanders

Delaware Wing has had 22 Wing Commanders since the inception of Civil Air Patrol. A list of each commander and their years of service are listed below.

Recognition and accomplishments
Overall, Delaware Wing has had 37 Spaatz cadets.

In 2006, Delaware Wing received a Unit Citation. In the fiscal year 2005, they had the highest number of hours flown per aircraft than any other wing in Civil Air Patrol by over 60%, a wide margin. In addition, they have earned one of the best compliance Inspection grades in the country over the past 5 years.

Delaware Wing's Lt Col John McGaha was featured in the Nov/Dec 2008 edition of CAP's Volunteer Magazine. He was named National Senior Member of the Year this past August. The story speaks of his lifelong dedication to the cadet program.

See also
Delaware Air National Guard
Delaware State Guard

References

Further reading

External links 
  Official Delaware Wing Website

Wings of the Civil Air Patrol